The New Zealand  International Comedy Festival is held simultaneously over three weeks during April/May in Auckland and Wellington. From its beginnings as a 2-day event, the Festival has now developed into a major nationwide event with a total attendance of over 100,000 people each year. The Festival is run by the New Zealand Comedy Trust.

Main events
Each year the Festival features over 200 shows and involves around 250 performers. The Festival contains a wide range of comedy performances – from emerging artists through to NZ comedy industry veterans and stars of the international comedy circuit.

Similarly, the Festival caters for a wide range of audiences with specific shows aimed at children and teenagers, and a diverse offering of comedy fare.

The opening of the Festival is the televised Comedy Gala, a showcase of performances by the top local and international comedians appearing in the festival. Past venues include St. James Theatre until 2008, and since then the Auckland Civic Theatre and ASB Theatre, Aotea Centre. Past hosts of the gala have included: Jeff Green, Ardal O'Hanlon, Arj Barker, Wayne Brady, Ed Byrne, Bill Bailey, Rove McManus, Greg Behrendt, Jeremy Corbett, Jason Byrne and Rhys Nicholson.

Alongside the large number of local and international shows, there are a number of events held annually such as the Class Comedians programme. This is an initiative set up to train talented high school students in the art of stand-up comedy and ends with a showcase at Q Theatre. Its most successful graduate is Rose Matafeo. The RAW rookie competition is also held every year, with the national finals at The Classic Comedy and Bar in Auckland.

To conclude the festival is the Last Laughs awards showcase. It is the last chance for the nominees for the Billy T Award and Fred Award to perform before the winners are announced at the end of the show. Other festival prizes awarded at Last Laughs include: Best International Comedian, Best Local Show, Best Newcomer, Best Marketing and Spirit of the Festival.

Awards and grants
The New Zealand Comedy Trust supports & rewards excellence within the comedy industry through the following awards and grants:

Festival Awards:  Announced at Last Laughs on the last Sunday of the Festival, these awards include Best Marketing Campaign, Spirit of the Festival, Best International Show, and Best Newcomer.

Billy T Award : Also announced at Last Laughs, this award recognizes exceptional potential in an up-and-coming New Zealand comedian.

Fred Award:  Also announced at Last Laughs, this award rewards the best New Zealand show within the Festival.

References

Comedy festivals in New Zealand
Spring (season) events in New Zealand
Festivals in Auckland
Festivals in Wellington